Lilak may refer to:

Újpest FC 
Lilak, Dastestan, Bushehr Province, Iran
Lilak, Tangestan, Bushehr Province, Iran

See also

Lilac